Robert Dale Dutton (October 13, 1950 – July 23, 2022) was an American politician of the Republican Party. After serving two years as a State Assemblyman for the 63rd district, from 2002 to 2004, Dutton served as a State Senator representing the 31st district from 2004 to 2012, and was the state senate's minority leader from 2010 to 2012. He made an unsuccessful run for the U.S. House of Representatives in 2012. In 2014, he was elected as Assessor-Recorder-County Clerk of San Bernardino County and re-elected in 2018, holding the position until his death.

Early life, education, and early career
Dutton was born in Lincoln, Nebraska in 1950. In 1972, he received an A.A. in real estate from Los Angeles Valley College. In 1976, he became President of the local Kiwanis.

He served in the Army Reserve in 1969 and then went on to serve on the California Air National Guard. Dutton owned the real estate company Dutton & Associates, Inc. He was also involved with the YMCA and the Red Cross.

He began his public service as a City Councilman for Rancho Cucamonga, California.

California legislature

Elections
After redistricting, incumbent Republican State Assemblyman Bill Leonard decided to retire in order to run for a seat on the California Board of Equalization. Dutton decided to run in the vacant California's 63rd State Assembly district and won the Republican primary with 45% of the vote in a three candidate field. He won the general election by defeating Democratic nominee Donna Wallace 61%–39%.

In 2004, he decided to retire from his seat in the 63rd Assembly district in order to run for California's 31st State Senate district, vacated by retiring Republican State Senator Jim Brulte. He defeated Democratic nominee Marjorie Mikels 60%–40%. In 2008, he won re-election to a second term with 59% of the vote.

Committee assignments
2011–2012
Emergency Management Committee
Labor and Industrial Relations Committee
Audit Committee
Rules Committee

2009–2010
Budget and Fiscal Review Committee (Vice Chair)
Transportation and Housing Committee
Rules Committee
Joint Legislative Budget Committee

2012 congressional election

In January 2012, Dutton decided to retire from the California Senate to run in the newly redrawn California's 31st Congressional District, based in San Bernardino County, and vacated by retiring U.S. Congressman Jerry Lewis. Dutton lost the general election to fellow Republican Gary Miller by a 55% to 45% margin.

Assessor-Recorder of San Bernardino County
In September 2013, Dutton announced his candidacy for the San Bernardino County Assessor-Recorder, vacated by retiring County Assessor-Recorder Dennis Draeger. Dutton won the June 3, 2014 California Primary Election to Dan Harp, receiving over 50% of the vote and avoiding a November run-off election.

As a division of the Assessor-Recorder-County Clerk responsibilities, Dutton was the keeper of the historical archives.

In 2018, Dutton was re-elected unopposed. At the time of his death, he was seeking another term in the 2022 election, and was again unopposed.

Committee assignments
2014–2022
California Assessor's Association – Legislative Committee 
County Recorder's Association of California

Personal life
He married Andrea Guillen in 1981, and they had one daughter. Dutton died from cancer on July 23, 2022, at the age of 71.

References

External links
Join California Bob Dutton

1950 births
2022 deaths
20th-century American businesspeople
21st-century American businesspeople
21st-century American politicians
American chief executives
American real estate businesspeople
California National Guard personnel
California city council members
Republican Party California state senators
Candidates in the 2012 United States elections
Los Angeles Valley College people
Republican Party members of the California State Assembly
National Guard (United States) officers
People from Rancho Cucamonga, California
Place of death missing
Politicians from Lincoln, Nebraska
United States Army soldiers